Because of You is a 2015 Philippine television drama romantic comedy series broadcast by GMA Network. It premiered on the network's Telebabad line up and worldwide on GMA Pinoy TV from November 30, 2015 to May 13, 2016, replacing Beautiful Strangers.

Mega Manila ratings are provided by AGB Nielsen Philippines.

Series overview

Episodes

November 2015

December 2015

January 2016

February 2016

March 2016

April 2016

May 2016

Episodes notes

References

Lists of Philippine drama television series episodes